Grazia Nidasio (9 February 1931 – 25 December 2018) was an Italian comic artist and illustrator.

Life and career
Born in Milan, Nidasio graduated from the Liceo scientifico in her hometown and later from the Brera Academy. In the 1950s she started a long collaboration with the children magazine Corriere dei Piccoli, for which she worked for over 35 years, creating a large number of popular characters, starting from Alibella and Gelsomino. She is best known for the series  and its spin-off  , which between late 1960s and early 1990s recounted in a realistic, tender and humorous way the everyday life of two adolescent sisters of their time.  Her comics have been published in a number of countries, including France, Brazil and Argentina.

Nidasio collaborated with Corriere della Sera as a cartoonist and an illustrator, and illustrated numerous children books, including several Astrid Lindgren's novels. She also worked in advertising, notably creating the Piccolo mugnaio bianco ("Little white miller") character, i.e. the mascot of the 1980s Mulino Bianco advertising campaigns.

References

External links
 Grazia Nidasio at Lambiek

1931 births
2018 deaths
Artists from Milan
Italian comics artists
Italian illustrators